Agonopterix tibetana is a moth in the family Depressariidae. It was described by S.X. Wang in 2007. It is found in China (Tibet).

References

Moths described in 2007
Agonopterix
Moths of Asia